Lino Aldani (29 March 1926 – 31 January 2009) was an Italian science fiction writer.

Biography 
Aldani was born in San Cipriano Po in 1926. He lived  in Rome, where he worked as a mathematics teacher until 1968, when he returned to his native San Cipriano Po and devoted his life to writing.

He published science fiction stories starting in the Sixties (his first published short story being "Dove sono i vostri Kumar?", in 1960) and his first novel, Quando le radici, in 1977.
In 1962 he wrote the first Italian critical essay about science fiction, La fantascienza. In 1963 Aldani founded the SF magazine Futuro with Massimo Lo Jacono; the magazine lasted eight issues.

His works have been translated into several languages. He died in Pavia on 31 January 2009.

Bibliography

  La Fantascienza (1963), essay;
 Aleph 3 (1963), his first novel, first published in 2007;
 Quarta Dimensione (1964);
 Quando le radici (1977), a novel whose main character, Arno, looks for his past in a future, disturbing Italy; 
 Eclissi 2000 (1979), a novel about the impossibility of creating a government without resorting to lies and deceit;
 Nel segno della luna bianca (1980; also known as Febbre di luna, with Daniela Piegai), a left-wing inspired fantasy novel;
 La croce di ghiaccio (1989), novel;
 Themoro Korik (2007), a novel about Romani people.

References

 
 
 Afterword to Eclissi 2000, De Vecchi Editore, 1979. 
 Simone Brioni and Daniele Comberiati, Italian Science Fiction: The Other in Literature and Film. New York: Palgrave, 2019.

External links
Bibliography of Aldani's works in Catalogo della fantascienza, fantasy e horror edited by E. Vegetti, P. Cottogni, E. Bertoni
Obituary in Locus magazine website

1926 births
2009 deaths
People from the Province of Pavia
Italian science fiction writers
Italian male non-fiction writers
Italian speculative fiction critics
Italian speculative fiction editors
Italian psychological writers
Deaths from lung cancer in Lombardy